The Selfish Woman is a lost 1916 American drama silent film directed by E. Mason Hopper and written by Hector Turnbull and Margaret Turnbull. The film stars Wallace Reid, Cleo Ridgely, Edythe Chapman, Charles Arling, Joe King and Jane Wolfe. The film was released on July 9, 1916, by Paramount Pictures.

Plot

Cast 
Wallace Reid as Tom Morley
Cleo Ridgely as Alice Hale Morley
Edythe Chapman as Mrs. Hale 
Charles Arling as Thomas Morley Sr
Joe King as Donald McKenzie
Jane Wolfe as Indian Servant 
William Elmer as Jim
Horace B. Carpenter as Mike
Bob Fleming as Foreman 
Milton Brown as Sheriff

References

External links 
 
 
 lobby poster

1916 films
1910s English-language films
Silent American drama films
1916 drama films
Paramount Pictures films
Films directed by E. Mason Hopper
American black-and-white films
Lost American films
American silent feature films
1916 lost films
Lost drama films
1910s American films